Danger Beneath the Sea is a 2001 American made-for-television action film directed by Jon Cassar, and starring Casper Van Dien.

Plot
This is a nightmare scenario, true for many Cold War submarine veterans. After a North Korean nuclear missile test goes wrong, the American nuclear attack submarine USS Lansing is cut off from communications. Detecting radioactivity in the air and believing the world to be at nuclear war, the executive officer takes command of the ship from the captain and prepares to fire the submarine's nuclear missiles at targets in Russia. Some members of the crew do not believe they are at war and help the captain take back control of the ship. Meanwhile, a second American submarine is sent to hunt down and destroy the Lansing before it can start a real war.

In the end, the captain is successful in regaining control of the vessel and preventing the missile launch. After outmaneuvering the other submarine, the captain surfaces in a Russian harbor and uses a mobile phone (gained from a crewman who brought it on board during a stop-over in Tokyo) to contact an admiral and inform them that the situation is now under control.

Cast
 Casper Van Dien as Commander Miles Sheffield 
 Gerald McRaney as Admiral Eugene Justice 
Stewart Bick as XO Lt. Commander Albert Kenner 
Tammy Isbell as Lt. Clare Holliday 
Ron White as CPO Pete LeCroix 
 Kim Poirier as Lisa Alford 
Vince Corazza as Lt. Commander Eric Watkins
Paul Essiembre as St1 Tony Martinez 
Dominic Zamprogna as AS Ryan Alford 
Michael McLachlan as Lt. Sal Lombardi 
Jim Thorburn as AS Matt Rockwell 
Justin Peroff as Lt. Howard Lowenstein 
 Joel Gordon as PO3C Terry Peel 
Shane Daly as Lt. Commander Gary Reynolds
Brad Austin as PO1C Ross 
Russell Yuen as Lt. Neil Ryan 
Billy Parrott as Radioman Dunkel 
Toby Proctor as Seaman

External links 
 

2001 television films
2001 films
2001 action films
American action television films
Cold War submarine films
Films directed by Jon Cassar
Films about the United States Navy
2000s English-language films